The Windmill Hill Historic District is a historic district encompassing a large rural landscape in Jamestown, Rhode Island.  It is bounded on the north by Eldred Avenue, on the east by East Shore Road, on the south by Great Creek, and on the west by Narragansett Bay.  The area's historical resources included six farmsteads, as well as the Quaker Meetinghouse, the Jamestown Windmill, and its associated miller's house and barn.  The area is predominantly rolling hills with open pastureland and forest.  The district was listed on the National Register of Historic Places in 1978.  The area is also rich in prehistoric evidence of Native American occupation, which is the subject of the Jamestown Archeological District listing on the National Register.

See also

Watson Farm, a museum farm operated by Historic New England located in the district
National Register of Historic Places listings in Newport County, Rhode Island

References

External links

Historic districts in Newport County, Rhode Island
Historic American Buildings Survey in Rhode Island
Jamestown, Rhode Island
Historic districts on the National Register of Historic Places in Rhode Island
National Register of Historic Places in Newport County, Rhode Island